Alex Kirby may refer to:

Alex Kirby (journalist) (born 1939), British journalist
Alex Kirby (Blue Heelers), a fictional character from Australian TV series Blue Heelers